The 2016 Big 12 Conference women's soccer tournament was the postseason women's soccer tournament for the Big 12 Conference, held from November 2 to 6, 2016. The seven-match tournament was played at the Swope Soccer Village in Kansas City, Missouri. The eight team single-elimination tournament consisted of three rounds based on seeding from regular season conference play. The West Virginia Mountaineers claimed their third Big 12 tournament title after defeating the TCU Horned Frogs in overtime in the championship match

Regular season standings
Source:

Bracket

Schedule

Quarterfinals

Semifinals

Final

Awards

Most valuable player
Source:
Offensive MVP – Ashley Lawrence – West Virginia
Defensive MVP – Kadeisha Buchanan – West Virginia

All-Tournament team

References

External links
2016 Big 12 Soccer Championship

 
Big 12 Conference Women's Soccer Tournament